"Soft Flowing Avon" is a 1769 song with music written by Thomas Arne and lyrics by David Garrick. It was composed for and first staged at the Shakespeare Jubilee in Stratford-upon-Avon in 1769. The lyrics refer to the River Avon which flows through the town, the birthplace of William Shakespeare. The piece was later part of the Shakespeare Pageant performed at the Drury Lane Theatre. The song and the Jubilee were part of the growing culture of Bardolatry which sprung up in the eighteenth century.

References
 Shaughnessy, Robert (ed.). The Cambridge Companion to Shakespeare and Popular Culture. Cambridge University Press, 2007.

18th-century songs
1769 songs
Compositions by Thomas Arne